The Volkswagen Type 18A is a limited production variant of the Volkswagen Type 1 made for the German police that started production in 1949. In German it was called "Polizei Cabriolet" or Gendarmerier. It was also used by East Berlin's fire department. In total 482 were made, 203 by Karosserie Austro-Tatra. The lack of doors made it easy to get in or out of the car, but made it uncomfortable during the winter. The brakes were mechanical. 

The car was initially made by Hebmüller, but in 1950 production was moved to Karmann. Later a version with doors (15A M47) was also produced. During the late 1940s, four different types of Polizei Cabriolet were made, based on either Type 1 sedans or VW running gear. by Karmann, Hebmüller (which had a cabriolet top and mostly used four cloth doors), Papler (based in Köln, which differed in having four steel doors; only two are known to survive), and Austro-Tatra (which also used steel doors, and like the Hebmüller had a cabriolet top).

Notes

Convertibles
Type 18A
Cars powered by boxer engines
Police vehicles